Shuanggui Subdistrict is a subdistrict in Liangping District, Chongqing, China. , it administers the following seven residential neighborhoods and ten villages:
Neighborhoods
Daheba Community
Taihe Community
Zhenglong Community
Zhangqiao Community
Xinmin Community
Huixing Community
Zaojiao Community

Villages
Songzhu Village
Xinglong Village
Anning Village
Xiangshui Village
Niutou Village
Qianming Village
Huangni Village
Liangshui Village
Anfu Village
Yanhe Village

See also 
 List of township-level divisions of Chongqing

References 

Township-level divisions of Chongqing